Eibar Rugby Taldea (known as Avia Eibar RT for sponsorship reasons) is a Spanish rugby team based in Eibar.

History
The club was founded in 1977.

Season to season

4 seasons in División de Honor B

External links
Official website

Rugby union teams in the Basque Country (autonomous community)
Rugby clubs established in 1977
Eibar
1977 establishments in Spain
Sport in Gipuzkoa